Roseococcus thiosulfatophilus is a species of bacterium, the type species of its genus.

Description

It is an obligately aerobic, bacteriochlorophyll a-containing bacteria.

References

Further reading

External links

LPSN
Type strain of Roseococcus thiosulfatophilus at BacDive -  the Bacterial Diversity Metadatabase

Rhodospirillales
Bacteria described in 1994